Grand Rebbe Meyer Rosenbaum (1852–1908), Kretchnifer Rebbe, was the son of Rabbi Mordechai of Nadvorna (1824–1894). His scholarly work is called "Razah DeUvdah."

He was the only person whom his father authorized to issue kameyos (written amulets) to chassidim. Rosenbaum was also the father of Grand Rabbi Eliezer Zev Rosenbaum (who perished in 1944 in the Holocaust), Kretchnifer Rebbe, and Rabbi Issamar of Nadvorna.

Rosenbaum is buried in Kretchnif.

References

1852 births
1908 deaths
Rebbes of Nadvorna